Javier Méndez González (born April 22, 1964) is a Cuban baseball player and Olympic silver medalist.

References 
 
 

1964 births
Living people
Olympic baseball players of Cuba
Olympic silver medalists for Cuba
Olympic medalists in baseball
Medalists at the 2000 Summer Olympics
Baseball players at the 2000 Summer Olympics
Pan American Games gold medalists for Cuba
Baseball players at the 1999 Pan American Games
Baseball players at the 2003 Pan American Games
Pan American Games medalists in baseball
Central American and Caribbean Games gold medalists for Cuba
Competitors at the 1990 Central American and Caribbean Games
Competitors at the 1998 Central American and Caribbean Games
Goodwill Games medalists in baseball
Central American and Caribbean Games medalists in baseball
Competitors at the 1990 Goodwill Games
Medalists at the 1999 Pan American Games
Medalists at the 2003 Pan American Games